Pocky & Rocky is a 1992 scrolling shooter video game developed and published by Natsume for the Super Nintendo Entertainment System (Super NES). It is the sequel to Taito's 1986 arcade game KiKi KaiKai. Pocky & Rocky follows the adventures of a young Shinto shrine maiden, Pocky, and her new tanuki companion, Rocky, as they attempt to save a group of goblins from evil forces. Gameplay takes place from a top-down perspective and features both single-player and cooperative modes.

The game was generally well-received by critics. It was followed by Pocky & Rocky 2 (1994) and Pocky & Rocky with Becky (2001). A new entry, Pocky & Rocky Reshrined, released in 2022.

Gameplay

Pocky & Rocky is a scrolling shooter video game that takes place from a top-down perspective. The screen can move either horizontally or vertically and the player-controlled characters can move in eight directions. The game features six levels and allows its players to continue indefinitely.  In single-player mode, the player can choose to play as either Pocky or Rocky. In two-player cooperative mode, both characters are on the screen at the same time.

Pocky can use her  to hit enemies from afar or swing her gohei to damage enemies close up. Likewise, Rocky can throw leaves across the screen or quickly turn his backside and swing his tail. Both characters can slide across the ground to cover the area quickly. If a player bumps into the other while sliding in a two-player game, it will cause the other player to spin out of control across the screen, damaging any enemies they come in contact with. A limited-use special bomb attack can be used to hit several or all the enemies present on the screen. There are some differences between both characters. Pocky moves and slides slightly faster than Rocky does. However, Rocky's slide attack goes a long distance. Pocky's bomb attack is more powerful than Rocky's, although Rocky's bombs cover a wider area. Pocky can also perform a spinning attack, whereas Rocky is able to transform into an invulnerable and immobile statue for a short time.

Various power-ups can be acquired that will increase the effectiveness of either Pocky or Rocky's attacks, such as making their projectiles larger or giving them the ability to throw multiple ones at once. Others include a shield that absorbs enemy attacks, and a power-up that replenishes hit points, giving Pocky and Rocky more endurance. A floating being called "Help man" is hidden in each level that will drop power-ups when found.

Plot
Set in a Far East-themed world, Pocky & Rocky is about a young miko girl named Pocky (known in Japan as ) who is tending to a Shinto shrine when she is visited by Rocky the Tanuki, or raccoon dog (known in Japan as ). Rocky is a member of a group of creatures known as the Nopino Goblins. Some time ago, the Nopino Goblins (Yōkai in Japan) went insane, but were stopped and cured by Pocky. Rocky tells Pocky that the Nopino Goblins have gone insane yet again and that she must help them. Suddenly, Pocky and Rocky are ambushed by the Nopino Goblins, which appear to be under a spell. Together, Pocky and Rocky must unravel the mystery of who is controlling the Nopino Goblins. Throughout the game, they battle a number of creatures from Japanese mythology, including kappas.

Release
Pocky & Rocky was licensed by Taito to Natsume, who developed and published the game for release in Japan in 1992 and the rest of the world in 1993. It is the sequel to the 1986 arcade game KiKi KaiKai. In Japan, Pocky & Rocky was broadcast on the Satellaview service on June 6, 1997.

Reception

Pocky & Rocky was generally well-received by critics, with some calling the gameplay addictive. The two-player mode was considered by some reviewers to add a lot of value to the game. In addition, the controls were considered easy to pick up and play. On the other hand, some reviewers experienced slowdowns in frame rate. The graphics of the game, especially the backgrounds and enemies, received praise for being colorful and well-animated, many comparing it to The Legend of the Mystical Ninja in graphical style. The special effects and weather effects in the game were also well received by reviewers. However, some critics commented on the lack of parallax scrolling and Mode 7 effects. The music and sound were positively received, and many critics thought it fit the theme and setting of the game well. In 1996, Super Play ranked the game 91st on their Top 100 SNES Games of All Time.

Sequels
Pocky & Rocky spawned three official sequels and one spiritual successor. In Pocky & Rocky 2 (1994) for SNES, Pocky and Rocky must work together once again to stop a forced marriage between a princess and a tyrant. In the second sequel, Pocky & Rocky with Becky (2001) for Game Boy Advance, the duo are joined by their friend Becky to stop a hydra dragon. The latest entry, Pocky & Rocky Reshrined, released for the PlayStation 4 and Nintendo Switch in 2022.

UFO Interactive Games released a spiritual successor to the series, Heavenly Guardian (2007), developed by Starfish for the PlayStation 2 and Wii.

References

Notes

References

 Reference group a

External links
Pocky & Rocky at GameFAQs
Pocky & Rocky at MobyGames

1992 video games
Shoot 'em ups
Cooperative video games
Natsume (company) games
Pocky & Rocky
Super Nintendo Entertainment System games
Super Nintendo Entertainment System-only games
Video game sequels
Video games based on Japanese mythology
Video games featuring female protagonists
Video games about raccoons
Fictional religious workers
Video games set in feudal Japan
Video games scored by Hiroyuki Iwatsuki
Video games developed in Japan
Multiplayer and single-player video games